El Ecologista is a Spanish quarterly magazine with a special focus on environment which is owned by Ecologistas en Acción based in Madrid, Spain. It has been in circulation since 1999.

History and profile
El Ecologista was launched by Ecologistas en Acción in 1999. Its first issue was numbered 17 to reflect the fact that it was the continuation of a magazine with the same name which was established in 1979. The headquarters of El Ecologista is in Madrid.

The magazine is published on a quarterly basis and covers articles on climate, biodiversity, genetic engineering, forest, energy, pollution, radioactive waste, transports and natural resources.

See also
The Ecologist

References

External links
 

1999 establishments in Spain
Environmental magazines
Environmentalism in Spain
Magazines established in 1999
Magazines published in Madrid
Quarterly magazines published in Spain
Spanish-language magazines